The Grand Order of King Dmitar Zvonimir, or more fully the Grand Order of King Dmitar Zvonimir with sash and Morning Star (Velered kralja Dmitra Zvonimira s lentom i Danicom), is an order of the Republic of Croatia. It ranks fourth in the Croatian order of precedence after the Grand Order of King Petar Krešimir IV. The order is among only four orders that hold the title of grand order and has one class, like all Croatian orders and decorations (except the Homeland's Gratitude Medal).

Only highly ranked state and religious officials, whether foreign or national, are eligible for this order.

It is named after King Demetrius Zvonimir of Croatia.

Notable recipients

Foreign
  Dai Bingguo
  Max Streibl
  Alois Mock
  Edmund Stoiber
  Ronald Harmon Brown
  Margaret Thatcher
  William J. Perry
  Otto von Habsburg
  Jacques Paul Klein

Croatian
 2007 - Franjo Komarica
 2004 - Vladko Maček (posthumously)
 2000 - Miroslav Krleža (posthumously)
 2000 - Savka Dabčević-Kučar
 2000 - Ivan Supek
 2000 - Vlado Gotovac (posthumously)
 2000 - Miko Tripalo (posthumously)
 1998 - Gojko Šušak (posthumously)
 1995 - Ivan Aralica
 1995 - Dalibor Brozović
 1995 - Šime Đodan
 1995 - Jakob Eltz
 1995 - Mate Granić
 1995 - Ranko Marinković
 1995 - Ivan Milas
 1995 - Ivić Pašalić
 1995 - Vlatko Pavletić
 1995 - Vladimir Šeks
 1995 - Antun Vrdoljak
 1995 - Andrija Hebrang
 1995 - Ivan Jarnjak
 1995 - Pero Jurković
 1995 - Vjekoslav Kaleb
 1995 - Ivica Kostović
 1995 - Jure Radić
 1995 - Stjepan Sulimanac (posthumously)
 1995 - Petar Šegedin
 1995 - Lujo Tončić-Sorinj
 1995 - Janko Vranyczany-Dobrinović

References

Orders, decorations, and medals of Croatia
Awards established in 1995
1995 establishments in Croatia